The 2015–16 Sam Houston State Bearkats women's basketball team represented Sam Houston State University during the 2015–16 NCAA Division I women's basketball season. The Bearkats, led by tenth year head coach Brenda Welch-Nichols, played their home games at the Bernard Johnson Coliseum and were members of the Southland Conference. They finished the season 14–18, 7–11 in Southland play to finish in a tie for eighth place. They advanced to the championship game of the Southland women's tournament where they lost to Central Arkansas.

Roster

Schedule

|-
!colspan=9 style="background:#FF7F00; color:#FFFFFF;"| Exhibition

|-
!colspan=9 style="background:#FF7F00; color:#FFFFFF;"| Non-conference regular season

|-
!colspan=9 style="background:#FF7F00; color:#FFFFFF;"| Southland Conference regular season

|-
!colspan=9 style="background:#FF7F00; color:#FFFFFF;"| Southland Women's Tournament

See also
 2015–16 Sam Houston State Bearkats men's basketball team

References

Sam Houston Bearkats women's basketball seasons
Sam Houston State
Sam Houston State Bearkats basketball
Sam Houston State Bearkats basketball